Septoria azaleae is a fungal plant pathogen infecting azaleas.

References

External links 
 Index Fungorum
 USDA ARS Fungal Database

azaleae
Fungal plant pathogens and diseases
Ornamental plant pathogens and diseases
Fungi described in 1899